Free Newfoundland also written as "Free NFLD" is a slogan coined by Newfoundland and Labrador cartoonist Wallace Ryan in 1982. This slogan appeared on posters around St. John's during the 1980s to encourage and promote Newfoundland & Labrador nationalism. In the early 1990s, an unnamed artist painted this slogan at the end of George Street in St. John's without the knowledge or permission of Mr. Ryan. Although many in the province debate the meaning of the slogan, Mr. Ryan is quite explicit when it comes to the meaning of the slogan when asked about it. "'Free Newfoundland' is without doubt, a call to the people of Newfoundland and Labrador to seek a different path than that presented to us by Confederation and that path, is independence for the province."

In the mid-1990s, Mr. Ryan licensed the slogan to Living Planet to produce a line of t-shirts with the slogan accompanied by a bright red star above appearing above it. Living Planet has gone on to produce a line of products based on this slogan from mugs to underwear. It is one of the best selling t-shirts in the history of the company.

(NOTE: "NFLD" is the former postal acronym for Newfoundland and Labrador. It was replaced by "NF" and then in recent years, "NL")

External links 
Free Nfld page at Living Planet (Clothing), St. John's
Telegram article on "Free Newfoundland" graffiti

Slogans
Separatism in Canada
Politics of Newfoundland and Labrador